Wapinitia is an unincorporated community in Wasco County, Oregon, United States.

Wapinitia is a name derived from a Native American language most likely meaning "at the edge".

References

External links 
Photo of Wapinitia by Oregon ducatisti

Unincorporated communities in Wasco County, Oregon
Unincorporated communities in Oregon